From the Heart may refer to:

Albums
 From the Heart (Etta Jones album), a 1962 album by Etta Jones
 From the Heart (Hank Crawford album), a 1962 album by Hank Crawford
 From the Heart (Tom Jones album), third studio album, 1966
 From the Heart (Janie Fricke album), a 1979 album by Janie FRicke
 From the Heart, Shadow Project's third and final album, 1998
 From the Heart (Another Level album) compilation
 From the Heart (Doug Stone album)
 From the Heart (Katherine Jenkins album)
 From the Heart (Ankie Bagger album)
 From the Heart, album by Smokie
 From the Heart - Bonnie Tyler Greatest Hits, compilation

Songs
 From the Heart (Another Level song), from Nexus
 "From The Heart", a song by Hoobastank from the 2003 album The Reason

Films
 Dil Se.. (From the Heart), a 1998 Indian Hindi film

Other
 From the Heart (campaign), ITV campaign initiative to raise awareness for organ donation
 From the Heart, a 2017 novel by Susan Hill

See also
One from the Heart, a musical film directed by Francis Ford Coppola